The 16th annual Webby Awards for 2012 were held at the Hammerstein Ballroom in New York City on May 21, 2012 and hosted by comedian Patton Oswalt. Winners were selected from among roughly 10,000 entries and voting by the public for the People's Choice Award was available prior to April 26. The awards ceremony was streamed live in HD on its website.

Newly added to this ceremony were awards for the categories "Mobile Advertising," "Corporate Social Responsibility," and "Best Meme." The "Best Meme" Category represented the first time that there would be no individual credit and no award recipient apart from the meme itself.

Nominees and winners

(from http://www.webbyawards.com/webbys/current.php?season=16)

This table is not complete, please help to complete it from material on this page.

References
Winners and nominees are generally named according to the organization or website winning the award, although the recipient is, technically, the web design firm or internal department that created the winning site and in the case of corporate websites, the designer's client.  Web links are provided for informational purposes, both in the most recently available archive.org version before the awards ceremony and, where available, the current website.  Many older websites no longer exist, are redirected, or have been substantially redesigned.

External links
Official website

2012
2012 awards in the United States
2012 in New York City
May 2012 events in the United States
2012 in Internet culture